Dennis Praet (born 14 May 1994) is a Belgian professional footballer who plays as a central midfielder for Premier League club Leicester City, and the Belgium national team.

Early life
Praet was born in Leuven, Flemish Brabant.

Club career

Youth at Genk
Praet joined the Genk youth academy in 2003 at the age of 8. He went on to spend most of his youth career at Genk, where he quickly made an impression and played for the club's youth teams until 2010. He was part of a strong generation at the club and scouts considered him one of the top talents. He became part of Belgium's youth teams and attracted the interest of clubs like Arsenal, Barcelona, Ajax and Lille.

Anderlecht

In May 2010 Praet transferred from Genk to Anderlecht turning down more lucrative offers. At Anderlecht he started out with the under-19 team, continuing to impress. In 2011, he received the prize for best player during the AEGON Future Cup in Amsterdam, a youth tournament in which teams like Ajax and Bayern Munich also competed.

Praet debuted in Anderlecht's first team on 21 September 2011 starting in the Belgian Cup against Lommel United and provided two assists in a 4–0 win. In the next round of the cup he scored his first official goal for Anderlecht, against Rupel Boom FC. Not long after, on 30 October, he also made his debut in the Belgian Pro League as a substitute for Fernando Canesin while playing against Lierse SK. In March 2012, Praet signed a new contract until 2015.

During the 2012–13 season, Praet played regularly for Anderlecht as the club won their second straight league title. A two-year contract extension was agreed in early 2014 to take him through to the summer of 2017. He scored the third goal in Anderlecht's 3–1 Jupiler Pro League play-off win over Lokeren on 25 May 2014 to seal Anderlecht's 33rd league title, and their third in a row.

Praet made his 100th competitive appearance for the club in the league match at Club Brugge on 31 August 2014. On 16 September, he scored away to Galatasaray in the UEFA Champions League group stage to put Anderlecht in front, but the Turkish club equalised in added time. His first league goal of the 2014–15 season came in the 2–2 draw at home to Club Brugge when he scored Anderlecht's opening goal to equalise midway through the first-half. Like his strike against Galatasaray in the Champions League, it went in off the post. He scored in four consecutive games for Anderlecht between 14 and 26 December 2014, with the league wins over KV Oostende, Waasland Beveren and KVC Westerlo and the Belgian Cup win against SV Zulte Waregem.

This rich of form at the end of the year was rewarded at a ceremony on 14 January 2015 where Praet won the 2014 Belgian Golden Shoe, the annual award given to the best player in the Jupiler Pro League for the previous calendar year. He polled five points (250) ahead of Víctor Vázquez of Club Brugge (245).

Sampdoria
On 24 August 2016, Praet's move to Sampdoria was finalised. Sampdoria paid a transfer fee of €10 million. After being heavily linked with a move to reigning Serie A champions Juventus during the 2018 summer transfer window, in November 2018, Praet signed a contract extension with Sampdoria, extending his stay at the club until 2021.

Praet was an ever present in the Sampdoria side during his three-year spell, appearing in 98 Serie A games and scoring 4 goals, as the club finished in the top half of the table all three seasons.

Leicester City
On 8 August 2019, Praet signed for Premier League club Leicester City on a five-year contract, for a reported fee of €20 million. On 18 August 2019, he made his league debut as a 73rd-minute substitute in a 1–1 draw against Chelsea. On 11 January 2020, Praet scored his first goal for Leicester City in 1–2 defeat against Southampton. On 20 September 2020, he scored his second goal in a 4–2 win over Burnley.

Torino 
On 31 August 2021, Praet joined Torino on a season-long loan.

International career

Belgium
Praet has represented Belgium at every age group under-15 and older making an appearance in the U21 team a mere three years after first playing for the U15 team.

On 6 November 2014, Praet received his first call up to the senior Belgian squad for the friendly at home to Iceland on 12 November, and the Euro 2016 Qualifier against Wales on 16 November. He made his senior international début coming on as a 76th-minute substitute for Christian Benteke after all four goals had been scored in the 3–1 friendly win over Iceland in Brussels.

Praet earned his second cap for Belgium almost four years on from his debut featuring in a 1–1 draw against rivals Netherlands in October 2018.

Career statistics

Club

International

As of match played 8 September 2021. Belgium score listed first, score column indicates score after each Praet goal.

Honours
Anderlecht
Belgian Pro League: 2011–12, 2012–13, 2013–14
Belgian Super Cup: 2012, 2013, 2014

Leicester City
FA Cup: 2020–21

Individual
Best player of AEGON Future Cup: 2011
Belgian Golden Shoe: 2014

References

External links

 
Profile at the Leicester City F.C. website
 

1994 births
Living people
Footballers from Flemish Brabant
Belgian footballers
Belgium youth international footballers
Belgium under-21 international footballers
Belgium international footballers
Association football midfielders
R.S.C. Anderlecht players
U.C. Sampdoria players
Leicester City F.C. players
Torino F.C. players
Belgian Pro League players
Serie A players
Premier League players
UEFA Euro 2020 players
Belgian expatriate footballers
Expatriate footballers in England
Expatriate footballers in Italy
Belgian expatriate sportspeople in England
Belgian expatriate sportspeople in Italy
Flemish sportspeople
Sportspeople from Leuven